Chauve Souris is an island in Seychelles, lying 400 m west of Anse La Mouche on the island of Mahé. The island is a rocky granite island covered with tropical forest. 
There is also a Chauve Souris island near the northern coast of the island of Praslin.

Image gallery

References

External links 

 Mahe Map 2015
 Info on the island

Islands of Mahé Islands
Uninhabited islands of Seychelles